Láng Temple (Chữ Hán: 昭禪寺) is a Buddhist temple in Láng village, Đống Đa District, Hanoi, Vietnam. It is known in French as Pagode des Dames (Temple of the Ladies). It worships Buddhist monk Từ Đạo Hạnh and was built by emperor Lý Anh Tông.

History

Architecture

See also
List of Buddhist temples in Hanoi

External links

Buddhist temples in Hanoi
Historical sites in Hanoi
12th-century Buddhist temples